Sean Anderson may refer to:
Sean Anderson (scientist), American conservation biologist
Big Sean (born 1988), American rapper
Sean Anderson, bass player in Finger Eleven
Sean Anderson, a character in the 2008 film Journey to the Center of the Earth
Sean Larry Anderson, Citizens for Constitutional Freedom militant in the occupation of the Malheur National Wildlife Refuge

See also
Shawn Anderson (born 1968), Canadian ice hockey player
Anderson (surname)